Sebastián "Seba" Andrés Setti Wasilewski (born 9 February 1984) is an Argentine professional footballer who plays for Spanish club SD Amorebieta as a central midfielder.

Club career
Setti used to play for Argentinos Juniors, Almagro in Argentina and Guaraní in Paraguay. He transferred to Royal Antwerp in 2008. On 14 August 2008, he scored his first goal for the club against K.A.S. Eupen. Manager Player Garzia Marcos (Garziafutbol) Agente players

Setti moved to China and signed a contract with Changchun Yatai in March 2010. He made his CSL debut for Changchun against Liaoning F.C. on 27 March.

On 13 January 2011, Setti signed a 2.5-year contract with Chornomorets Odesa.
At this club, he got promoted to the Ukrainian football Premier League, being team's vice-captain.

References

External links
 
 
 Sebastián Setti at Footballdatabase
 

1984 births
Living people
Argentine footballers
Club Guaraní players
Royal Antwerp F.C. players
Changchun Yatai F.C. players
Asteras Tripolis F.C. players
Argentinos Juniors footballers
Club Almagro players
FC Chornomorets Odesa players
Panthrakikos F.C. players
UE Costa Brava players
UE Figueres footballers
SD Amorebieta footballers
Argentine expatriate footballers
Argentine expatriate sportspeople in Paraguay
Expatriate footballers in Paraguay
Argentine expatriate sportspeople in Belgium
Expatriate footballers in Belgium
Argentine expatriate sportspeople in China
Expatriate footballers in China
Argentine expatriate sportspeople in Ukraine
Expatriate footballers in Ukraine
Argentine expatriate sportspeople in Cyprus
Expatriate footballers in Cyprus
Argentine expatriate sportspeople in Greece
Expatriate footballers in Greece
Argentine expatriate sportspeople in Spain
Expatriate footballers in Spain
Argentine Primera División players
Challenger Pro League players
Ukrainian Premier League players
Ukrainian First League players
Chinese Super League players
Super League Greece players
Cypriot First Division players
Segunda División B players
Association football midfielders
Sportspeople from Buenos Aires Province